Gary Hardinges (born 6 December 1965) is a British archer. He competed in the men's individual event at the 1996 Summer Olympics.

References

1965 births
Living people
British male archers
Olympic archers of Great Britain
Archers at the 1996 Summer Olympics
People from Eastcote